Ronen Badash (born 31 October 1977) is a former Israeli footballer who is of a Tunisian-Jewish descent.

Honours
Liga Leumit (1):
1998-99

References

1977 births
Living people
Israeli footballers
Maccabi Netanya F.C. players
Maccabi Herzliya F.C. players
Hapoel Nof HaGalil F.C. players
Bnei Yehuda Tel Aviv F.C. players
Israeli Premier League players
Liga Leumit players
Israeli people of Tunisian-Jewish descent
Association football midfielders